The Best of (həd) Planet Earth is a compilation album by American punk rock band Hed PE. Released on June 6, 2006, the album was compiled by Jive Records from the group's first three albums, Hed PE, Broke and Blackout, and released without the group's authorization, permission, consent, or knowledge.

Reception 

In his review of the album, Allmusic's Rob Theakston wrote "[The Best of Hed Planet Earth] may not be a definitive look at the group, but it's a nice overview of the first half of the band's career."

Track listing

References 

Hed PE compilation albums
2006 greatest hits albums
Jive Records compilation albums